Rayna Diane Green (born 1942) is an American curator and folklorist. She is Curator Emerita, in the Division of Cultural and Community Life at the National Museum of American History, Smithsonian Institution.

Her research expertise is on American Indian representations, the history of American Indian women, American identity, and American foodways - topics which she has explored through exhibitions, published research, film making and music compilations.

Early life and education 
Green was born in Dallas, Texas in 1942. She graduated with a B. A., in American Literature from Southern Methodist University in 1963 and then an M.A. in American Studies from the same institution in 1966. She undertook a Ph.D. in Folklore and American Studies at Indiana University, which she completed in 1973.  Green was the first American Indian to receive a Ph.D. in that field.

Between 1964 and 1966, Green was a Peace Corps Volunteer in Ethiopia.

Career 
Green worked for a number in years in academia, including posts at the University of Arkansas and University of Massachusetts. Between 1976 and 1980 she was Director of the Project on Native Americans in Science for the American Association for the Advancement of Science and between 1980 and 1984 she was Associate Professor of Native American Studies at Dartmouth College, In 1984 Green began work at the National Museum of American History as a consultant, before becoming director of the American Indian Program in 1986.

Green produced many public programs at the museum, including performance programs on Native dance and song and symposiums on contemporary Native art, science and technology.  She curated a number of exhibitions, including "American Encounters"; “Bon Appétit: Julia Child’s Kitchen at the Smithsonian"; “Food: Transforming the American Table, 1950-2000”.

Green was involved as scriptwriter and director of three documentary short films on Pueblo life and culture: We Are Here: 500 Years of Pueblo Resistance (1992), which was awarded the Ciné Golden Eagle, in 1992; Corn Is Who We Are: The Story of Pueblo Indian Food (1995) which was awarded the Silver Apple, National Educational Film Festival, in 1995 and From Ritual to Retail: Pueblos, Tourism, and the Fred Harvey Company (1995), which was produced to tie in with the exhibition, Inventing the Southwest: The Fred Harvey Company and Native American Art.

She also co-ordinated two audio recordings of Native women's music: Heartbeat: The Voices of First Nations Women (Smithsonian Folkways, 1995) and Heartbeat 2: More Voices of First Nations Women (Smithsonian Folkways, 1998).

Green has written or edited four books (Native American Women: A Contextual Bibliography (1983); That’s What She Said: Contemporary Fiction and Poetry By Native American Women (editor, 1984); Women in American Indian Society (1992); The British Museum Encyclopedia of Native North America (1999) and is also the author of many academic articles.

She was made Curator Emerita at the National Museum of American History in 2014.

Recognition 
Green served as president of the American Folklore Society between 1986 and 1987. She is a former councillor of the American Society for Ethnohistory and a founding member of both the Cherokee Honor Society and the American Indian Science and Engineering Society.

In 2008, she was Leman Brady Professor at the Center for Documentary Studies at Duke University.

Selected publications 
 Green, Rayna (1975). "The Pocahontas Perplex: The Image of Indian Women in American Culture". The Massachusetts Review. 16 (4): 698–714. .
 Green, Rayna; Malcom, Shirley Mahaley (1976). "AAAS Project on Native Americans in Science". Science. 194 (4265): 597–598. .
 Green, Rayna (1977). "Magnolias Grow in Dirt: The Bawdy Lore of Southern Women". The Radical Teacher (6): 26–31. .
 Green, R. (1980). Native American Women. Signs, 6(2), 248–267. .
 Green, Rayna (1983). Native American women: a contextual bibliography. Bloomington: Indiana University Press. . .
 Green, Rayna (1984). That's what she said: contemporary poetry and fiction by Native American women. . .
 Green, Rayna (1988). "The Tribe Called Wannabee: Playing Indian in America and Europe". Folklore. 99 (1): 30–55. 
 Green, Rayna (1991). "The Mickey Mouse Kachina". American Art. 5 (1/2): 208–209. .
 Green, R. (1990) 'American Indian Women: Diverse Leadership for Social Change', in Albrecht and Brewer, eds. Bridges of Power: Women's Multicultural Alliances. Santa Cruz, Calif.: New Society Publishers.. .
 Green, R. (1991) Women in American Indian Society. Chelsea House Publishers, New York. . .
 Green, R. (1991) 'On Looking in the Mirror of An Institution'. Virginia Foundation for the Humanities and Public Policy Newsletter; reprinted in Northeast Indian Quarterly, Summer, 1990; The Graduate Quill, SUNY/Buffalo, April, 1991.
 Green, R. (1992) 'Rosebuds of the Plateau: Frank Matsura and the Fainting Couch Aesthetic', in Lucy Lippard, ed. Partial Recall: Photographs of Native North Americans. New York: New Press. . 
 Green, R. (1992) 'Mythologizing Pocahontas' In Carol E. Robertson. Musical Repercussions of 1492: Encounters in Text and Performance. Washington, DC: Smithsonian Institution Press. . .
 Green, R. (1992) 'Red Earth People and Southeastern Basketry", in Linda Mowat, ed. Basketmakers: Meaning and Form in Native American Baskets. Oxford, England: Pitt Rivers Museum. . .
 Green, R. (1993) 'Repatriating Images: Indians and Photography', Rendezvous 28. Nos. 1 and 2 (Spring/Fall, 1993). 151–158.
 Green, R. (1993) 'Culture and Gender in Indian America." in Patricia Hill Collins and Margaret Anderson, eds. Race, Culture and Gender: An Anthology. Belmont, Ca., Wadsworth Publishing Co., 1994.
 Green, R. (1993) "Grass Don't Grow On a Racetrack and Other Paradigms for Folklore and Feminism", Introduction to Jane Young et al., eds. Folklife and Feminist Theory, University of Illinois Press, 1993
 Green, R. (1996) 'We Never Saw These Things Before': Southwest Indian Laughter and Resistance to the Invasion of the Tse va ho', in M. Weigle. The Great Southwest of the Fred Harvey Company and the Santa Fe Railway. Phoenix: The Heard Museum, . .
 Green, R. (1999) 'A Modest Proposal: The Museum of the Plains White Person', in Robert Torricelli, Andrew Carroll, and Doris Kearns Goodwin, eds. In Our Own Words: Greatest Speeches of The American Century. Kodansha America, Inc., 1999. . .
 Green, Rayna; Fernandez, Melanie (1999). The British Museum encyclopaedia of native North America. London: British Museum Press. . .
 Green, Rayna (2000-03-01). "Gertrude Käsebier's 'Indian' Photographs". History of Photography. 24 (1): 58–60. . .
 Green, R. (2008). "Mother Corn and the Dixie Pig: Native Food in the Native South". Southern Cultures. 14 (4): 114–126. .
 Green, Rayna (2012-11-21), 'Public Histories of Food' in Pilcher, Jeffrey M. (ed.). The Oxford Handbook of Food History. Oxford University Press. .
 Green, Rayna (2018). "School Days for Me and the Museum: Commentary on Remembering Our Indian School Days, a Landmark Exhibit at the Heard Museum". Journal of American Indian Education. 57 (1): 30–36. . .

References

External links 
 "Shooting Back: New Frontiers in the Indian Image Wars" - Rayna Green lecture at Hood Museum, Dartmouth College, 2012.

Living people
Presidents of the American Folklore Society
American folklorists
American curators
Southern Methodist University alumni
Indiana University alumni
1942 births
American women curators
Women folklorists